The Ural Oblast (Russian: Уральская область; Eng: Uralskaya Oblast) was an oblast (province) of the Russian Empire. It roughly corresponded to most of present-day western Kazakhstan. It was created out of the territories of the former Kazakh khanate.

Demographics
As of 1897, 684,590 people populated the oblast. Kazakhs constituted the majority of the population. Significant minorities consisted of Russians and Tatars. Total Turkic speaking were 478,695 (74,2%).

Ethnic groups in 1897

References

 
Oblasts of the Russian Empire
Kazakhstan in the Russian Empire